Hockey at the 1992 Olympics may refer to:

Ice hockey at the 1992 Winter Olympics
Field hockey at the 1992 Summer Olympics
Roller hockey at the 1992 Summer Olympics